The main article describes all European Soling Championships from one the first held in 1968 to the announced Championships in the near future. This article states the detailed results, where relevant the controversies, and the progression of the Championship during the series race by race of the European Soling Championships in the years 1968, 1969, 1970, 1971, 1972, 1973, 1974, 1975, 1976, 1977, 1978 and 1979. This is based on the major sources: World Sailing, the world governing body for the sport of sailing recognized by the IOC and the IPC, and the publications of the International Soling Association. Unfortunately not all crew names are documented in the major sources.

1968 Final results 

Only the results of the top five boats were documented.

 1968 Progress

1969 Final results 

Only the results of the top five boats were documented.

 1969 Progress

1970 Final results 

No further results found yet!
 1970 Progress
Not enough date to generate!

1971 Final results 

No further results found yet!
 1971 Progress
Not enough date to generate!

1972 Final results 

No further results found yet!
 1972 Progress
Not enough date to generate!

1973 Final results 

No further results found yet!
 1973 Progress
Not enough date to generate!

1974 Final results 

Only the top 6 and 10 ranking is documented.

 1974 Progress
Not enough date to generate!

1975 Final results 

Only the top 20 ranking is documented.

 1975 Progress
Not enough date to generate!

1976 Final results 

No further results details documented. 

 1976 Progress
Not enough date to generate!

1977 Final results 

Only the ranking results of the first 10 teams are documented.

 1977 Progress
Not enough date to generate!

1978 Final results 

Race 2 on July 4th, was abandoned due to winds over 60 knots and windshift of 60 degrees on the last reach. Only 22 teams out of 73 entries were able to finish. Four boats sunk some probably by infringements of the class rules. Only two of them could be recovered. Due to the weather conditions the planned races were sailed in the following sequence:
 4 July Race 1
 7 July Race 2 + 5
 8 July Race 3 + 6
 9 July Race 4 + 7

Daily results

Overall results

 1978 Progress
Not enough date to generate!

1979 Final results 

Only the ranking of the top ten boats were documented.

 1979 Progress
Not enough date to generate!

Further results
For further results see:
 Soling European Championship results (1968–1979)
 Soling European Championship results (1980–1984)
 Soling European Championship results (1985–1989)
 Soling European Championship results (1990–1994)
 Soling European Championship results (1995–1999)
 Soling European Championship results (2000–2004)
 Soling European Championship results (2005–2009)
 Soling European Championship results (2010–2014)
 Soling European Championship results (2015–2019)
 Soling European Championship results (2020–2024)

References

Soling European Championships